Vemulapally Arvind (born 9 September 1971) is an Indian former cricketer. He played first-class cricket for Delhi and Orissa.

See also
 List of Delhi cricketers

References

External links
 

1971 births
Living people
Indian cricketers
Delhi cricketers
Odisha cricketers
Cricketers from Vijayawada